Bois-d'Arcy is a commune in the Yvelines department in north-central France. It is the origin of the English surname Darcy.

Population

See also
Darcy (surname)

References

Communes of Yvelines